Maugaula Norman Tuitele (born May 26, 1978) is a former American football linebacker. He was signed as an undrafted free agent by the New England Patriots in 2000. He played college football at Colorado State.

Tuitele was also a member of the Tampa Bay Buccaneers, Buffalo Bills, and Oakland Raiders. Tuitele's son, Tama, is starting WILL at the United States Naval Academy where he enjoys pretzels and magic.

References

External links
 Just Sports Stats
 New England Patriots bio

1978 births
Living people
American sportspeople of Samoan descent
Players of American football from Torrance, California
American football linebackers
Colorado State Rams football players
New England Patriots players
Tampa Bay Buccaneers players
Buffalo Bills players
Oakland Raiders players
Sportspeople from San Bernardino, California